Sean McCarthy (born 12 December 1990) is a rugby union player for Bedford Blues. His preferred position is loosehead prop. He represented Ireland at under 18 level and previously played for Worcester Warriors.

In May 2014 it was announced that he would join Leinster for the 2014-15 season. On 15 March 2015, McCarthy resigned with Jersey Reds from the 2016-17 season. On 10 March 2017, McCarthy signs for Championship rivals Bedford Blues ahead of the 2017-18 season.

References

1990 births
Living people
Irish rugby union players
Rugby union props
Rugby union players from West Midlands